The 1951 French Championships (now known as the French Open) was a tennis tournament that took place on the outdoor clay courts at the Stade Roland-Garros in Paris, France. The tournament ran from 23 May until 3 June. It was the 55th staging of the French Championships, and the second Grand Slam tennis event of 1951. Jaroslav Drobný and Shirley Fry won the singles titles.

Finals

Men's singles

 Jaroslav Drobný defeated  Eric Sturgess 6–3, 6–3, 6–3

Women's singles

 Shirley Fry defeated  Doris Hart 6–3, 3–6, 6–3

Men's doubles
 Ken McGregor /  Frank Sedgman  defeated  Gardnar Mulloy /  Dick Savitt  6–2, 2–6, 9–7, 7–5

Women's doubles
 Shirley Fry /  Doris Hart defeated  Beryl Nicholas-Bartlett /  Barbara Scofield 10–8, 6–3

Mixed doubles
 Doris Hart /  Frank Sedgman defeated  Thelma Coyne Long /  Mervyn Rose  7–5, 6–2

References

External links
 French Open official website

French Championships
French Championships (tennis) by year
French Championships (tennis)
French Championships (tennis)
French Championships (tennis)
French Championships (tennis)